Beijing Royal School (BRS) is a private high school located in the Changping District of Beijing, China. It was founded in 2003 by Guangfa Wang. 

China Daily ranked Beijing Royal School as the 10th most expensive private school in Beijing.

Programs 
BRS requires two years of general secondary education, with the requirement to take the Beijing Education Committee's standard certifying test. Two years of higher level foreign education, with AP, IB or A-Level courses available depending on student preferences.

References

External links
English website

International schools in Beijing
Educational institutions established in 2003
2003 establishments in China
Changping District